Herochroma pallensia is a species of moth of the family Geometridae first described by Hongxiang Han and Dayong Xue Dayong in 2003. It is found in the Chinese provinces of Hunan, Fujian and Guangxi.

The length of the forewings is 21.5–23 mm for males.

References

External links
A study on the genus Herochroma Swinhoe in China, with descriptions of four new species (Lepidoptera: Geometridae: Geometrinae). Acta Entomologica Sinica

Moths described in 2003
Pseudoterpnini
Moths of Asia